Gerasim I Sokolović was Archbishop of Peć and Serbian Patriarch from 1574 to 1586. He was the third primate of the restored Serbian Patriarchate of Peć, and cousin of previous Serbian Patriarch Antonije I.

Gerasim belonged to the prominent Serbian Sokolović family. He was nephew of Serbian Petriarch Makarije Sokolović (1557–1571). During the patriarchal tenure of his cousin Antonije I (1571–1574), Gerasim became Metropolitan of Herzegovina. When Patriarch Antonije died in 1574, Metropolitan Gerasim was elected new Serbian Patriarch, with residence in the Patriarchal Monastery of Peć. In that time, his other cousin Mehmed Sokolović, from the Islamized branch of the family, held the post of the Grand Vizier of the Ottoman Empire (1565–1579) and acted as protector of the Serbian Patriarchate. As patriarch, Gerasim appointed his cousin Savatije Sokolović to be the next Metropolitan of Herzegovina. In time, some disputes arose between two cousins, resulting in rivalry for the patriarchal throne. Eventually, Metropolitan Savatije managed to succeed Patriarch Gerasim, probably in 1585 or 1586.

References

Sources

External links
 Official site of the Serbian Orthodox Church: Serbian Archbishops and Patriarchs 

Gerasim I
16th-century Eastern Orthodox bishops
16th-century Serbian people
16th century in Serbia
Year of birth unknown
1574 deaths
Ottoman Serbia
16th-century people from the Ottoman Empire